Double Barrel is a 2015 Indian Malayalam-language spoof gangster film written, directed, and co-produced by Lijo Jose Pellissery. It was jointly produced by August Cinema and Amen Movie Monastery. The film stars an ensemble cast including Prithviraj Sukumaran, Indrajith Sukumaran, Arya, Chemban Vinod Jose, Sunny Wayne, Swathi Reddy, Isha Sharvani, Vijay Babu, Anil Radhakrishnan Menon, Thomas Berly, Parvathi Menon, Sabumon Abdusamad, Rachana Narayanankutty, Anil Murali, Asif Ali and Pearle Maaney. Prashant Pillai composed the film's music.

Plot

Laila and Majnu are two precious stones, which has value only if they are together. It is now possessed by an underworld don in Goa, who tries to sell it, in order not to lose it to his son, Gabbar, whom he despises. Don approaches two experienced gangsters, Pancho and Vinci and offers it for a price of ₹10 crores. They agree and ask for a week's time to arrange the money. Billy, who is Gabbar's man, learns of this and offers Pancho and Vinci ₹100 crores to buy it. Pancho and Vinci gets ₹5 crores from Blacky, which actually belongs to the Tarkovs (the Russian mob in Goa). For the remaining ₹5 crores, they plan to rob the black money of Podiyadis (a local hawala gang in Kerala). While the deal happens, things get mixed up and lead to a big gang war between all the groups.

Cast

 Prithviraj Sukumaran as Pancho
 Indrajith Sukumaran as Vinci
 Arya as Majnu
 Sunny Wayne as Silent 
 Chemban Vinod Jose as Diesel
 Master Varghese as Kid
 Isha Sharvani as Shaolin Sweety
 Swathi Reddy as Laila
 Asif Ali as He (Lover boy)
 Pearle Maaney as She (Lover girl)
 Vijay Babu as Billy
 Steev Thekkanath as Gabbar
 Thomas Berly as Don
 Sherrin Varghese as Tarkov
 Parvathi Menon as Lady Tarkov
 Poornima Indrajith as Smitha
 Anil Radhakrishnan Menon as Mario Benzo/Boss
 Bineesh Kodiyeri as Vincent
 Sajid Yahiya as Chaplie
 Anil Murali as Podiyadi Soman
 Sabumon Abdusamad as Podiyadi Martin
 Rachana Narayanankutty as Kochumary
 Manu as Ummer
 John as Blacky
 Shaji Nadesan as Unnibaby
 Sujith Vasudev as Husband at hotel
 Muthumani as Wife at Hotel
 Baiju Thekkekara as Jesus
 Sunny as Uncle Django

Production
Double Barrel was announced on 2014, as a gangster comedy movie in the backdrop of Goa, starring brothers Prithviraj and Indrajith Sukumaran. The climax was shot using four Red Dragon 6K cameras.

Release 
Double Barrel was released in theatres on 28 August 2015. Surya TV bought the satellite rights.

Critical reception
Asha Prakash of The Times of India rated 2.5/5 stars and said "Other than the visual spectacle of seeing some major actors in the industry in their clownish avatars in the most impressive of settings, there is nothing much to engage the viewer. The shooting and killing seem never-ending and the jokes tedious". Veeyen of Nowrunning.com rated 1.5/5 and criticized the script, musical score, humour and direction, while concluding as "'Double Barrel' sends the spoof genre on a downward spiral with a relentlessly unexciting script. Real crazy indeed". Moviebuzz of Sify.com heavily criticized the film and described it as a "flawed experiment", adding that, "The script is messy and some of the characters are so badly written that they just come and go in between without any impact in the whole narrative. The overindulgence of the makers is evident, ignoring the hapless viewers in the process". IndiaGlitz.com rated 1.5/5 stars stating that "'Double Barrel' not only is the content insane, so is the presentation", and said that the film fails to engage.

Soundtrack

Prashant Pillai, who had composed for all of Lijo Jose Pelliserry's earlier films, composed the songs and background score of the film.

References

External links
 

2015 films
2010s Malayalam-language films
2010s crime comedy films
Indian gangster films
Indian crime comedy films
Films shot in Goa
Films directed by Lijo Jose Pellissery
2015 comedy films